Harbutowice may refer to several villages in Poland:
 Harbutowice, Lesser Poland Voivodeship - village in Myślenice County, Lesser Poland Voivodeship
 Harbutowice, Silesian Voivodeship - village in Cieszyn County, Silesian Voivodeship